The Russian Special Army was a World War I Russian field army that fought on the Eastern Front.

Field management was established in August 1916.
The Army was named Special because it was thought that the name 13th Army would bring bad luck.

Composition

At the end of 1917 the army consisted of:
 31st Army Corps
 39th Army Corps
 44th Army Corps
 XLVI Corps
 I Turkestan Army Corps
 IV Cavalry Corps
 VII Cavalry Corps

Deployment

Western Front (August–September 1916)
Southwestern Front (September–November 1916)
Western Front (November 1916 – July 1917)
Southwestern Front (July 1917 – early 1918)

Commanders 

The commanders of the Army were: 
 14.08.1916 – 10.11.1916 - General of Cavalry Vasily Gurko
 10.11.1916 – 17.02.1917 - General of Infantry Pyotr Baluyev
 17.02.1917 – 31.03.1917 - General of Cavalry  Vasily Gurko
 02.04.1917 – 09.07.1917 - General of Infantry Pyotr Baluyev
 12.07.1917 – 29.08.1917 - General of Cavalry Ivan Erdélyi
 29.08.1917 – 14.09.1917 - Acting Major General Vasily Sarychev
 14.09.1917 – 20.11.1917 - General of Infantry Stepan Stelnitsky 
 11.1917 - Acting Colonel Alexander Ilyich Yegorov
 20.11.1917 – 13.12.1917 - Lieutenant General Theodore Rerberg
 13.12.1917 – 19.12.1917 - Lieutenant General Alex Kushakevich
 12.19.1917 – 03.1918 - Colonel Vladimir Yegoryev

See also
 List of Russian armies in World War I

References

Armies of the Russian Empire
Military units and formations established in 1916
1916 establishments in the Russian Empire
Military units and formations established in 1918